The 1995 Speedway Grand Prix of Germany was the third race of the 1995 Speedway Grand Prix season. It took place on 8 July in the Motorstadion in Abensberg, Germany and was won by Danish rider Tommy Knudsen.

Starting positions draw 

The Speedway Grand Prix Commission nominated Gerd Riss as wild card. Josh Larsen was replaced by Jan Stæchmann. Second track reserve rider was replaced by Peter Karlsson.
Draw 11.  (9) Josh Larsen →  (10) Jan Stæchmann
Draw 17.  (10) Jan Stæchmann →  (17) Mikael Karlsson
Draw 18.  (17) Mikael Karlsson →  (19) Peter Karlsson

Heat details

The intermediate classification

See also 
 Speedway Grand Prix
 List of Speedway Grand Prix riders

References

External links 
 FIM-live.com
 SpeedwayWorld.tv

Speedway Grand Prix of Germany
G
1995